Piero Trapanelli (born 13 July 1924) is an Italian former football player and coach.

Career
Born in Milan, Trapelli played football as a winger for A.C. Milan in the pre-war period and again briefly after the war. He would later enjoy success with A.S. Varese 1910, Pisa Calcio and Treviso F.B.C. 1993 before retiring to become a manager.

References

External links 
Profile at Enciclopediadelcalcio.it
 

1924 births
Possibly living people
Italian footballers
Footballers from Milan
A.C. Milan players
U.S. Cremonese players
S.S.D. Varese Calcio players
Pisa S.C. players
Association footballers not categorized by position